The Pakistan national cricket team toured the republic of India in the 1952–53 season, playing five Tests. The First Test was the first-ever Test for Pakistan after its inception and the second match resulted in Pakistan's first Test victory. India won the series 2–1 with two Tests being drawn.

The Pakistan team

Abdul Kardar (captain)
Imtiaz Ahmed
Khurshid Ahmed
Maqsood Ahmed
Zulfiqar Ahmed
Israr Ali
Rusi Dinshaw
Amir Elahi
Waqar Hasan
Anwar Hussain
Mahmood Hussain 
Khalid Ibadulla
Fazal Mahmood
Hanif Mohammad
Khan Mohammad
Nazar Mohammad
Wazir Mohammad
Khalid Qureshi

Tour matches

Three-day: North Zone v Pakistanis

Three-day: Central Zone v Pakistanis 
{{Two-innings cricket match
| date = 31 October–2 November 1952
| team1 = 
| team2 = Central Zone

| score-team1-inns1 = 356 (94.3 overs)
| runs-team1-inns1 = Imtiaz Ahmed 213*
| wickets-team1-inns1 = Hiralal Gaekwad 4/131 (35 overs)

| score-team2-inns1 = 271 (80.5 overs)
| runs-team2-inns1 = Syed Mushtaq Ali 73
| wickets-team2-inns1 = Mahmood Hussain 5/116 (22.5 overs)

| score-team1-inns2 = 275/5d (88 overs)
| runs-team1-inns2 = Abdul Hafeez Kardar 106
| wickets-team1-inns2 = Syed Rahim 3/67 (19 overs)

| score-team2-inns2 = 98/8 (26 overs)
| runs-team2-inns2 = Balbir Khanna 43
| wickets-team2-inns2 = Khalid Qureshi 5/21 (9 overs)

| result = Match drawn
| report = Scorecard
| venue = Madhya Pradesh Cricket Association Ground, Nagpur
| umpires = 
| toss = Pakistanis won the toss and elected to bat.
| rain = 
| notes = Khurshid Ahmed scored a century on debut in first-class matches.
Mahmood Hussain claimed his first five-wicket haul in first-class matches.
}}

 Three-day: Central Zone v Pakistanis 

 Three-day: Central Zone v Pakistanis 

 Three-day: South Zone v Pakistanis 

 Three-day: Indian Universities v Pakistanis 

 Three-day: East Zone v Pakistanis 

Test matches

1st Test

2nd Test

3rd Test

4th Test

5th Test

Aftermath
In 2003, to mark the 50th anniversary of the tour, the surviving members of the Pakistani team were awarded a commemorative medallion, a cash prize of 250,000 rupees, and a current green Pakistan blazer.

References

External links
 Tour page on ESPNcricinfo
 

Further reading
"Pakistan in India, 1952", Wisden 1953, pp. 872–83
 Abdul Kardar, Inaugural Test Matches'', 1954

1952 in Indian cricket
1952 in Pakistani cricket
Indian cricket seasons from 1945–46 to 1969–70
International cricket competitions from 1945–46 to 1960
1952-53